Juliana Didone Nascimento (born October 11, 1984) is a Brazilian actress and former model.

Television career
Born in Porto Alegre, Rio Grande do Sul, she is best known for her role as Letícia Gomes da Silva, the main character of the 2004 season of the telenovela Malhação. She was also in the 2005 season of the telenovela.

Her career as an actress started when she played the role of the preteen character Mariana in the short movie Fora de Controle. When she was 12 years old, she participated of the child play named Caçadores de Aventuras, where she played the role of Cléo. Her first telenovela role was in Desejos de Mulher, in 2002, where she played the role of a Rio Grande do Sul model.

Juliana Didone has also acted in several television commercials of various companies, like Grendene, Halls, Guaraná Antarctica, and Shiseido, of Japan. In 2008, she starred the summer campaign of Agilitá, which is a dress company, and was on the cover of the May edition of Criativa magazine.

She played Lia in the 2010 Rede Globo telenovela Passione. Juliana Didone played Brigitte in the 2011 telenovela Aquele Beijo.

She signed a contract with Rede Record in 2013 and she was part of the cast of the first telenovela by the author Carlos Lombardi in that network, Pecado Mortal.

Telenovelas
{| class="wikitable"
|- "
! Year !! Title !! Role !! Notes
|-
| 2002 || Desejos de Mulher || Tati||Telenovela
|-
| 2003 || Mulheres Apaixonadas || Luísa||Telenovela
|-
| 2004–2006 || Malhação || Letícia||Telenovela
|-
| 2006 || O Profeta || Baby||Telenovela
|-
| 2007 || Paraíso Tropical || Fernanda||Telenovela
|-
|rowspan="2"| 2008 || Casos e Acasos || Bianca||TV series
|-
| Negócio da China || Celeste/Heaven||Telenovela
|-
| 2009 || Xuxa Especial de Natal || Pastorinha Encarnada||Special
|-
| 2010 || Passione || Lia||Telenovela
|-
| 2011 || Aquele Beijo || Brigitte ||Telenovela
|-
| 2013 || Surtadas na Yoga || Leda||TV series
|-
| 2013 || Pecado Mortal<ref>{{cite web|title=Juliana Didone estreia na Record interpretando irmãs gêmeas em Pecado Mortal|url=http://www.purepeople.com.br/noticia/juliana-didone-estreia-na-record-interpretando-irmas-gemeas-em-pecado-mortal_a8708/1|publisher=Pure People|access-date=October 29, 2013|language=Portuguese}}</ref>  || Leila Vergueiro and Maria Clara (twin sisters) ||  Telenovela
|-
| 2015 || As Canalhas || Tatiana || TV series
|-
| 2015–2016 || Os Dez Mandamentos || Leila ||Telenovela
|-
| 2015 || O Hipnotizador || Livia||TV series
|-
|2017 || Belaventura || Edite Brione || Telenovela
|-
|2022
|Good Morning, Verônica|Mônica
|TV series
|}

 Theater 

 Movies 

Model career
Juliana Didone started her model career when she was 14 years old, living in the Japanese city of Tokyo for seven months. She has also lived in São Paulo city during her model career. In December 2003, she posed for Trip magazine. In that year, she has also appeared in the Mulheres que Amamos (meaning Women we Love'') section of the Brazilian Playboy magazine.

Dancing with the Stars
In March 2006, Juliana Didone and her partner, Leandro Azevedo, won the Brazilian version of the TV reality show Dancing with the Stars, called Dança dos Famosos.

References

External links
 
 Fanpage

Living people
1984 births
People from Porto Alegre
Brazilian telenovela actresses
Brazilian female models
Brazilian people of Italian descent
Dancing with the Stars winners